Daniel Ivanov may refer to:

Daniel Ivanov (born 1986), Bulgarian sumo wrestler known as Aoiyama Kōsuke
Daniel Ivanov (long jumper) (born 1965), Bulgarian long jumper